Lina Mushabash is a TV news presenter on BBC Arabic.

References

British television newsreaders and news presenters
Living people
Year of birth missing (living people)
Place of birth missing (living people)
British women journalists